Oscar Leon da Silva (born 21 September 1998) is a Brazilian-German professional basketball player for FC Barcelona of the Liga ACB and the EuroLeague. He played college basketball for the Stanford Cardinal.

Early life and career
da Silva was a standout for Ludwig Gymnasium in Munich and was also a member of the MTSV Schwabing in club play, where he averaged 21.0 points, 8.3 rebounds, 2.0 assists, 2.0 steals and 1.7 blocks per game in the 2016–17 season. He was selected for the NBBL All-Star Game. da Silva also attended the Internationale Basketball Akademie München (IBAM). He signed with Stanford on October 25, 2016 despite not meeting coach Jerod Haase, choosing the Cardinal over offers from California and several Ivy League institutions.

College career
After arriving at Stanford, da Silva injured an ankle in practice and missed a month. He averaged 6.2 points and 4.7 rebounds per game as a freshman. As a sophomore, he averaged 9.5 points and 6.0 rebounds per game. da Silva scored a career high 27 points and had 15 rebounds and three assists on February 1, 2020, in a 70–60 upset of Oregon. As a result, he was named Pac-12 player of the week on February 3. On February 8, da Silva suffered a lacerated head that required stitches after a collision with Evan Battey of Colorado. At the conclusion of the regular season, da Silva was named first-team All-Pac-12. As a junior, da Silva averaged 15.7 points and 6.4 rebounds per game. He averaged 18.8 points and 6.8 rebounds per game as a senior. da Silva was named to the first-team All-Pac-12 and the conference Scholar-Athlete of the Year.

Professional career
On March 24, 2021, da Silva announced he had signed on to play for MHP Riesen Ludwigsburg of Germany's Basketball Bundesliga for the remainder of the 2021 season. Following that, he began training in preparation for the 2021 NBA draft.

After going undrafted in the 2021 NBA draft, da Silva joined the Oklahoma City Thunder for the 2021 NBA Summer League. On September 30, he signed with Alba Berlin until 2024. He won the German championship and the German cup title in 2022. On July 11, 2022, he signed a three-year-deal with FC Barcelona.

National team career
In 2016, da Silva played for Germany at the Albert Schweitzer Tournament, an international U18 tournament in Mannheim, Germany. He averaged seven points, 5.4 rebounds and 1.7 blocks per game and won the gold medal. Later in the year, da Silva averaged 9.5 points and six rebounds per game for Germany at the 2016 FIBA U18 European Championship in Samsun, Turkey, leading his team to a fourth-place finish. He helped Germany to fifth place at the 2017 FIBA Under-19 World Cup in Cairo, averaging 10.3 points and four rebounds per game.

Career statistics

College

|-
| style="text-align:left;"| 2017–18
| style="text-align:left;"| Stanford
| 35 || 11 || 24.1 || .517 || .558 || .636 || 4.7 || 1.1 || .4 || .9 || 6.2
|-
| style="text-align:left;"| 2018–19
| style="text-align:left;"| Stanford
| 31 || 31 || 28.3 || .467 || .257 || .683 || 6.0 || 1.8 || .7 || 1.3 || 9.5
|-
| style="text-align:left;"| 2019–20
| style="text-align:left;"| Stanford
| 31 || 31 || 28.6 || .570 || .317 || .771 || 6.4 || 1.5 || 1.1 || .8 || 15.7
|-
| style="text-align:left;"| 2020–21
| style="text-align:left;"| Stanford
| 23 || 23 || 32.3 || .580 || .302 || .787 || 6.8 || 2.4 || .9 || 1.0 || 18.8
|- class="sortbottom"
| style="text-align:center;" colspan="2"| Career
| 120 || 96 || 27.9 || .539 || .337 || .743 || 5.9 || 1.7 || .8 || 1.0 || 12.0

Basketball-Bundesliga

Regular season 

|-
| style="text-align:left;"| 2020–21
| style="text-align:left;"| Ludwigsburg
| 9 || 0 || 14.9 || .547 || .200 || .692 || 3.3 || .7 || .4 || .3 || 7.8
|-
| style="text-align:left;"| 2021–22
| style="text-align:left;"| Berlin
| 31 || 13 || 20.4 || .629 || .385 || .758 || 5.1 || 1.2 || 1.1 || 1.2 || 11.4

Playoffs 

|-
| style="text-align:left;"| 2021
| style="text-align:left;"| Ludwigsburg
| 8 || 0 || 12.3 || .529 || .375 || .600 || 3.0 || .3 || .3 || .9 || 5.3
|-
| style="text-align:left;"| 2022
| style="text-align:left;"| Berlin
| 10 || 3 || 19.5 || .635 || .615 || .917 || 5.6 || .7 || .7 || .8 || 11.3

Source: basketball-stats.de (Date: 22 July 2022)

Personal life
da Silva has a Brazilian father and German mother. His father was a professional boxer before immigrating to Germany in the 1990s and owns a Brazilian restaurant in Munich. da Silva has a younger brother, Tristan, who currently plays basketball at the University of Colorado, Boulder. At Stanford University, he is a biology major and has carried out stem cell research. He is fluent in six languages: English, French, German, Latin, Portuguese and Spanish. da Silva's favorite player is Kevin Durant.

References

External links
Stanford Cardinal bio

1998 births
Living people
Alba Berlin players
Centers (basketball)
FC Barcelona Bàsquet players
German expatriate basketball people in the United States
German men's basketball players
German people of Brazilian descent
Liga ACB players
Power forwards (basketball)
Riesen Ludwigsburg players
Sportspeople from Munich
Stanford Cardinal men's basketball players